Şiləvəngə or Shilavegyakh or Shilavengya or Shilyavyangya or Şiläväng may refer to:
Şiləvəngə, Jalilabad, Azerbaijan
Şiləvəngə, Yardymli, Azerbaijan